"Fack" (stylised in all caps) is a song by American rapper Eminem, released in 2005 on his greatest hits album Curtain Call: The Hits. It was among the four new songs on the album. The song, along with “Intro”, is omitted from the clean version of Curtain Call: The Hits. In 2021, the song went viral on TikTok, due to many feeling shocked upon hearing the lyrics of "Fack".

Background 
In an interview with Detroit Free Press, Eminem jokingly claimed that "Fack" is his favorite song he's ever done. In 2016 at Lollapalooza in Brazil, Eminem performed the song in concert for the first time, much to the audience's surprise. It has been performed another two times since. Eminem jokingly stated that he was working on a followup song in tweet posted in 2020.

Reception 
AllMusic critic Stephen Thomas Erlewine called the song "wildly weird", and wrote that it "finds Eminem spending the entire track fighting off an orgasm; it seems tired, a little too close to vulgar Weird Al territory, and it doesn't help that his Jenna Jameson reference seems a little old".

Spence D. of IGN thought that "Fack" was "rather annoying", but considered it to have some of the best production Eminem has ever done. He also said, "Too bad his potty humored cartoon rant seems a bit played out and just a little over-the-top in that forced, trying-too-hard-to-be-campy way. This is a case where the beat would have been better served under different circumstances."

Medium considered the song to be "unbelievably unbearable", and wrote that it "simply describes Eminem's experience of shoving a gerbil up his ass for sexual pleasure."

HotNewHipHop however considered the song to have become a cult classic, and wrote,  "The way it's somehow too good to fall into the so-bad-it's-good category. The playful, circus-like instrumental that only Slim Shady could conjure. The idea that at one time or another, Dr. Dre was subjected to a 'Fack' listening session."

Certifications

References 

2005 songs
Eminem songs
Dirty rap songs
Song recordings produced by Eminem
Internet memes introduced in 2021
Songs written by Luis Resto (musician)
Songs written by Eminem